The IAAF Grand Prix Final was an athletics competition featuring track and field events staged by the International Association of Athletics Federations. It was first held in 1985 and replaced in 2003 by the IAAF World Athletics Final. For the most part of its history, the events were staged in early September in European major cities which also played host to prominent annual athletics meetings. Fukuoka City became the first non-European host in 1997. Doha followed in 2000 (also the first time the event was staged in October) and Melbourne was that last non-European host before the final edition of the competition was held in Paris in 2002.

The event programme was half that of a full traditional track and field programme, with events alternating each edition. For example, a men's 100 metres and women's 200 metres were contested in 1985, but not vice versa – that arrangement was reversed in 1986 and reversed again in 1987, and so forth. Middle-distance running was particularly prominent as a 1500 metres or a mile run were held at every edition of the tournament.

From 1982 to 1992, the winners of the Grand Prix title in an event were decided by the overall seasonal points rankings gained from competing on the IAAF Grand Prix circuit. This was amended in 1993 when seasonal points served as a method of qualifying for the final, with the event winner being the victor at the Grand Prix Final event. The athlete with the greatest number of points accumulated in the season across all events was declared the overall Grand Prix Final champion.

The Grand Prix Final had had a number of world records set in its history, including the Tim Montgomery 100 metres record that was later taken from him after the BALCO scandal.

Editions

Overall points leaders

Men

Women

References

External links 
 IAAF pages for Grand Prix Finals 1997-2002

 
Grand Prix Final
Final
Recurring sporting events established in 1985
Recurring events disestablished in 2003
Annual sporting events